List of rivers of Maryland (U.S. state).

The list is arranged by drainage basin from east to west, with respective tributaries indented under each larger stream's name and ordered from downstream to upstream.

By drainage basin

Delaware River
Christina River

Atlantic Ocean
Ayres Creek
Greys Creek
St. Martin River
Turville Creek
Trappe Creek

Chesapeake Bay Eastern Shore

Pocomoke River
Dividing Creek
Nassawango Creek
Little Annemessex River
Big Annemessex River
Manokin River
Monie Creek
Wicomico River 
Beaverdam Creek
Nanticoke River
Barren Creek
Mockingbird Creek
Marshyhope Creek
Big Creek
Stony Bar Creek
Krafts Creek
Spears Creek
Becky Taylor Branch
Mill Branch
Mill Creek
Puckum Branch
Wrights Branch
Skinners Run
Davis Millpond Branch
North Davis Millpond Branch
South Davis Millpond Branch
Miles Branch
Tanyard Branch
Faulkner Branch
Tull Branch
Sullivan Branch
Raccoon Branch
Wolfpit Branch
Tommy Wright Branch
Smithville Ditch
Transquaking River
Chicamacomico River
Blackwater River
Little Blackwater River
Meekins Creek

Honga River
Little Choptank River
Slaughter Creek
Parsons Creek
Fishing Creek
Choptank River
Harris Creek
Broad Creek
Tred Avon River
Town Creek
Warwick River
Tuckahoe Creek

Miles River
Front River
Wye River
Wye East River
Chester River
Corsica River
Cypress Branch
Andover Branch
Sewell Branch
Sassafras River
Elk River
Bohemia River
Big Elk Creek
Little Elk Creek
North East River
North East Creek
Little North East Creek
Stony Run
Principio Creek
Mill Creek

Susquehanna River
Susquehanna River
Deer Creek
Octoraro Creek
Basin Run
Conowingo Creek
Broad Creek

Chesapeake Bay Western Shore
Swan Creek
Gasheys Creek
Romney Creek
Bush River
Otter Point Creek
Winters Run
Bush Creek
Bynum Run
James Run
Grays Run
Cranberry Run
Gunpowder River
Saltpeter Creek
Dundee Creek
Bird River
Whitemarsh Run
Gunpowder Falls
Beaverdam Run
Western Run
McGill Run
Piney Run
Little Falls
Georges Run
Little Gunpowder Falls
Middle River
Seneca Creek
Frog Mortar Creek
Back River
Bread and Cheese Creek
Herring Run
Moores Run

Patapsco River
Bodkin Creek
Main Creek
Stony Creek
Bear Creek
Curtis Creek
Furnace Creek
Marley Creek
Northwest Branch Patapsco River
Jones Falls
Western Run
Towson Run
Middle Branch Patapsco River
Gwynns Falls
Deep Run
Herbert Run
Tiber Branch
North Branch Patapsco River
Morgan Run
Middle Run
Beaver Run
South Branch Patapsco River
Piney Run
Magothy River
Little Magothy River
Severn River
South River
North River

West River
Rhode River
Bear Creek
Sellman Creek
Patuxent River
Town Creek
Cuckold Creek
St. Leonard Creek
Indian Creek
Swanson Creek
Lyons Creek
Green Branch
Mill Branch
Western Branch Patuxent River
Collington Branch
Little Patuxent River
Middle Patuxent River
Hawlings River

Potomac River

Potomac River
St. Marys River
St. George Creek
Difficult Run
Wicomico River
Budds Creek
Popes Creek
Port Tobacco River
Nanjemoy Creek
Chicamuxen Creek
Mattawoman Creek
Pomonkey Creek
Piscataway Creek
Broad Creek (see Broad Creek, Prince George's County, Maryland)
Henson Creek (see Broad Creek, Prince George's County, Maryland)
Oxon Creek
Oxon Run
Anacostia River
Watts Branch (Anacostia River tributary)
Dueling Creek
Northeast Branch Anacostia River
Beaverdam Creek
Paint Branch
Little Paint Branch
Indian Creek (Anacostia River tributary)
Northwest Branch Anacostia River
Sligo Creek
Rock Creek
Little Falls Branch
Minnehaha Branch
Cabin John Creek
Rock Run
Carroll Branch
Limekiln Branch
Watts Branch (Potomac River tributary)
Muddy Branch
Seneca Creek
Dry Seneca Creek
Little Seneca Creek
Tenmile Creek
Great Seneca Creek
Horsepen Branch
Broad Run
Little Monocacy River
Monocacy River
Bennett Creek
Ballenger Creek
Bush Creek
Linganore Creek
Carroll Creek
Israel Creek
Tuscarora Creek
Little Tuscarora Creek
Fishing Creek
Big Hunting Creek
Little Hunting Creek (Maryland)
Owens Creek (Maryland)
Beaver Branch
Double Pipe Creek
Big Pipe Creek
Little Pipe Creek
Sams Creek
Toms Creek
Friends Creek
Middle Creek
Flat Run
Piney Creek
Alloway Creek
Marsh Creek
Rock Creek
Tuscarora Creek
Catoctin Creek
Broad Run (Catoctin Creek tributary)
Little Catoctin Creek (east)
Little Catoctin Creek (west)
Middle Creek
Little Catoctin Creek
Israel Creek
Antietam Creek
Little Antietam Creek (south)
Beaver Creek
Marsh Run
Little Antietam Creek (north)
Conococheague Creek
Little Conococheague Creek
Licking Creek
Little Cove Creek
Tonoloway Creek
Sideling Hill Creek
Bear Creek
Fifteenmile Creek
Town Creek
Flintstone Creek
North Branch Potomac River
Evitts Creek
Wills Creek
Jennings Run
Georges Creek
Laurel Run
Savage River

Mississippi River
Mississippi River
Ohio River
Monongahela River (PA)
Youghiogheny River
Casselman River
Reason Run
Bear Creek
Little Youghiogheny River

Alphabetically
Alloway Creek
Anacostia River
Antietam Creek
Back River
Ballenger Creek
Basin Run
Bear Creek (Rhode River tributary)
Bear Creek (Sideling Hill Creek tributary)
Bear Creek (Youghiogheny River tributary)
Beaver Branch
Beaver Creek
Beaver Run
Beaverdam Creek (Anacostia River tributary)
Beaverdam Creek
Beaverdam Run
Bennett Creek
Big Annemessex River
Big Elk Creek
Big Hunting Creek
Big Pipe Creek
Bird River
Blackwater River
Bodkin Creek
Bread and Cheese Creek
Broad Creek (Choptank River tributary)
Broad Creek (Potomac River tributary)
Broad Creek (Susquehanna River tributary)
Broad Run
Broad Run (Catoctin Creek tributary)
Budds Creek
Bush Creek
Bush Creek
Bush River
Bynum Run
Casselman River
Cabin John Creek
Carroll Branch
Catoctin Creek
Chester River
Chicamuxen Creek
Choptank River
Christina River
Conococheague Creek
Cranberry Run
Cuckold Creek
Curtis Creek
Deer Creek
Deep Run
Difficult Run
Dividing Creek
Double Pipe Creek
Dry Seneca Creek
Dueling Creek
Dundee Creek
Elk River
Evitts Creek
Fifteenmile Creek
Fishing Creek
Flat Run
Flintstone Creek
Friends Creek
Frog Mortar Creek
Furnace Creek
Gasheys Creek
Georges Creek
Georges Run
Great Seneca Creek
Grays Run
Gunpowder Falls
Gunpowder River
Gwynns Falls
Hawlings River
Harris Creek
Henson Creek
Herring Run
Horsepen Branch
Indian Creek (Anacostia River tributary)
Indian Creek (Patuxent River tributary)
Israel Creek
Israel Creek (Potomac River tributary)
James Run
Jennings Run
Jones Falls
Laurel Run
Licking Creek
Limekiln Branch
Linganore Creek
Little Antietam Creek (north)
Little Antietam Creek (south)
Little Catoctin Creek (east)
Little Catoctin Creek (west)
Little Catoctin Creek (Potomac River tributary)
Little Choptank River
Little Conococheague Creek
Little Cove Creek
Little Elk Creek
Little Falls Branch
Little Gunpowder Falls
Little Hunting Creek
Little Monocacy River
Little North East Creek
Little Paint Branch
Little Patuxent River
Little Pipe Creek
Little Seneca Creek
Little Tuscarora Creek
Little Youghiogheny River
Lyons Creek
Magothy River
Marley Creek
Marsh Creek (Catoctin Creek tributary)
Marsh Creek (Monocacy River tributary)
Marsh Run
Marshyhope Creek
Mattawoman Creek
McGill Run
Middle Creek (Catoctin Creek tributary)
Middle Creek (Toms Creek tributary)
Middle Run
Middle Patuxent River
Middle River
Mill Branch
Mill Creek
Minnehaha Branch
Monocacy River
Moores Run
Morgan Run
Muddy Branch
Nanjemoy Creek
Nanticoke River
North Branch Patapsco River
North Branch Potomac River
North East Creek
North East River
Northeast Branch Anacostia River
Northwest Branch Anacostia River
Northwest Branch Patapsco River
Octoraro Creek
Otter Point Creek
Oxon Creek
Owens Creek (Maryland)
Paint Branch
Patapsco River
Patuxent River
Piney Creek
Piney Run
Piney Run (Western Run tributary)
Piscataway Creek
Pocomoke River
Pomonkey Creek
Popes Creek
Port Tobacco River
Potomac River
Principio Creek
Reason Run
Rhode River
Rock Creek (Monocacy River tributary)
Rock Creek (Potomac River tributary)
Rock Run
St. Marys River
Saltpeter Creek
Sams Creek
Sassafras River
Savage River
Seneca Creek
Severn River
Sideling Hill Creek
Sligo Creek
South Branch Patapsco River
South River
Stony Creek
Stony Run (North East River tributary)
Susquehanna River
Swan Creek
Swanson Creek
Tenmile Creek
Toms Creek
Tonoloway Creek
Town Creek (Patuxent River tributary)
Town Creek (Potomac River tributary)
Town Creek (Tred Avon River tributary)
Towson Run
Tuckahoe Creek
Tuscarora Creek (Monocacy River tributary)
Tuscarora Creek (Potomac River tributary)
Watts Branch (Anacostia River tributary)
Watts Branch (Potomac River tributary)
West River
Western Run
Western Run (Gunpowder Falls tributary)
Western Branch Patuxent River
Whitemarsh Run
Wicomico River (Maryland eastern shore) 
Wicomico River (Potomac River tributary)
Wills Creek
Winters Run
Wye River
Youghiogheny River

See also
List of islands in Maryland
List of rivers in the United States

References
USGS Geographic Names Information Service
USGS Hydrologic Unit Map – States of Maryland and Delaware (1974)

Maryland rivers
 
Rivers